was a Japanese marathon runner.

He won the Boston Marathon in 1955 in a time of 2:18.22 which was a course record. He was 16th in the 1956 Olympic Games marathon in Melbourne.

After retiring from competitive racing, he became an athletics coach.

He died on 7 May 2000 from a malignant tumour.

References

External links

1928 births
2000 deaths
Boston Marathon male winners
Athletes (track and field) at the 1956 Summer Olympics
Olympic athletes of Japan
Athletes (track and field) at the 1958 Asian Games
Asian Games competitors for Japan
20th-century Japanese people